Wait Until Spring, Bandini is a 1989 film written and directed by Dominique Deruddere, based upon the novel of the same name by John Fante.  The film received the André Cavens Award for Best Film and won three Joseph Plateau Awards.

Plot

The film follows the Bandini family as they struggle through hard times in 1920s Colorado. Unemployed and broke, Svevo Bandini (Joe Mantegna) tries to come up with the money his family needs to make it through the winter, while putting up with his difficult mother-in-law (Renata Vanni), his nervous wife (Ornella Muti), and his three young boys.

Principal cast
 Joe Mantegna as Svevo Bandini
 Ornella Muti as Maria Bandini
 Faye Dunaway as Mrs. Hildegarde
 Michael Bacall as Arturo Bandini
 Daniel Wilson as August Bandini
 Alex Vincent as Federico Bandini
 Burt Young as Rocco Saccone
 Tanya Lopert as Sister Celia
 Renata Vanni as Donna Toscana
 Jean-Louis Sbille as Bank Employee

Production
Parts of the film were shot in Orem and Ogden, Utah.

References

External links 
 
 

1989 films
Belgian drama films
American drama films
Films about Italian-American culture
Films based on American novels
Films set in the 1920s
Films set in Colorado
Films shot in Utah
Films based on works by John Fante
1989 drama films
Films scored by Angelo Badalamenti
Films directed by Dominique Deruddere
English-language Belgian films
English-language French films
1980s English-language films
1980s American films
English-language drama films